Poppenberg Observation Tower ( "Poppenberg Observation Tower") is a steel German lattice observation tower that is used for observation, at the same time, for communication. It is a truss tower located in the summit of Poppenberg. It is one of the oldest steel lattice towers in Germany and was built in the year 1897. It was later on refurbished in 1994. The tower was built by the Nordhausen branch of the Harz Club. The tower was also named after Otto, Prince of Stolberg-Wernigerode. It has an antenna that is 33 metres long.

Geography

The Poppenberg Observation Tower is situated on the  mountain, Poppenberg, east of the village of Ilfeld, found in the free state of Thuringia. Its postal code is 99768.

See also

Poppenberg (Harz)
Gross Reken Melchenberg Radio Tower
Schomberg Observation Tower
Gillerberg Observation Tower
Madona Radio Towers

References

External links
SkyscraperPage Forum

Towers completed in 1897
Observation towers in Thuringia